Galal Yafai  (born 11 December 1992) is a British professional boxer who as an amateur won gold at the 2020 Tokyo Olympics. In his pro debut he won the vacant WBC International flyweight title.

Personal life
Yafai was born to Yemeni parents. He is the younger brother of boxers Kal Yafai and Gamal Yafai. Yafai was appointed Member of the Order of the British Empire (MBE) in the 2022 New Year Honours for services to boxing.

Amateur career
While representing England in the light-flyweight division, the southpaw won a silver medal at the 2017 European Championships and gold at the 2018 Commonwealth Games, and bronze while representing Great Britain in the flyweight division at the 2019 European Games. He also competed at the 2016 Rio Olympics.

At the 2016 European Boxing Olympic Qualification Tournament held in Samsun, Turkey, Yafai defeated Samuel Carmona Heredia of Spain by unanimous decision in his semifinal to secure his place in the 2016 Olympic. He won his round of 32 fight defeating Simplice Fotsala of Cameroon. He lost his Round of 16 fight to Joahnys Argilagos of Cuba.

In May 2019, Yafai was selected to compete at the 2019 European Games in Minsk, Belarus. He also competed at the 2019 World Championships in Yekaterinburg, Russia, where he lost by unanimous decision to Billal Bennama in the quarter-finals. He qualified to represent Great Britain at the 2020 Summer Olympics, where he won the gold medal in the flyweight division beating Carlo Paalam of the Philippines in the final.

Professional career
Yafai faced Carlos Vado Bautista for the vacant WBC International flyweight title on 27 February 2022, in his professional debut, on the undercard of the Lawrence Okolie and Michal Cieslak cruiserweight title bout. He captured the regional title by  a fifth-round technical knockout, as Bautista's corner decided to throw in the towel near the end of the round.

Yafai successfully defended his WBC International flyweight title against Miguel Cartagena on 30 April 2022, in his United States debut, on the undercard of the Katie Taylor vs. Amanda Serrano title unification bout, via a second round corner retirement.

Professional boxing record

References

External links
 
 
 
 
 

1992 births
Living people
Boxers at the 2016 Summer Olympics
Boxers at the 2018 Commonwealth Games
Boxers at the 2019 European Games
Boxers at the 2020 Summer Olympics
Boxers from Birmingham, West Midlands
Commonwealth Games gold medallists for England
Commonwealth Games medallists in boxing
English male boxers
English Olympic medallists
English people of Yemeni descent
European Games bronze medalists for Great Britain
European Games medalists in boxing
Flyweight boxers
Medalists at the 2020 Summer Olympics
Olympic boxers of Great Britain
Olympic gold medallists for Great Britain
Olympic medalists in boxing
Members of the Order of the British Empire
Medallists at the 2018 Commonwealth Games